The 2013 Campeonato Rondoniense de Futebol was the 23rd edition of the Rondônia's top professional football league. The competition began on March 17, and ended on June 1. Vilhena won the championship by the 4th time. while Ji-Paraná was relegated.

Format
On the first stage, all teams play against each other in a double round-robin. The best four teams advances to the semifinals. The semifinals and the finals are played in two-legged ties.

Qualifications
The champion qualifies to the Copa do Brasil. The team with the best record in the championship qualify to the Série D.

Participating teams

Moto Esporte Clube withdrawn its participation because its stadium was not fit for matches, according to the city's firefighters.

First stage

Standings

Results

Final stage

Semifinals

First leg

Second leg

Finals

Vilhena Esporte Clube is the champion of the 2013 Campeonato Rondoniense.

References

Rondoniense